Abigail "Abby" Miller is an American actress best known for her recurring role as Ellen May on the FX series Justified.

She graduated from the University of Nebraska-Lincoln and studied theater in London before moving to Los Angeles to pursue an acting career.

Prior to her work on television, Miller toured throughout the western United States as one half of the folk pop band Jen & Abby. In Los Angeles, the band found a home at the Hotel Café.

Filmography

References

External links

American television actresses
Living people
Actresses from Nebraska
Year of birth missing (living people)
University of Nebraska alumni
People from Clay County, Nebraska
21st-century American actresses